HMS Dolphin was a 3-gun packet brigantine ship of the Royal Navy, launched in 1836.

She participated in the Battle of Vuelta de Obligado. It was decommissioned in 1861 and sold in 1894.

References

External links
 

1836 ships
Ships of the Royal Navy